Jaunpils Municipality is a former Latvian municipality situated partly in the region of  Semigallia and partly in Courland. The municipality was formed in 2009 by merging Jaunpils Parish and Viesati Parish, the administrative centre being Jaunpils. As of 2020, the population was 2,141.

On 1 July 2021, Jaunpils Municipality ceased to exist and its territory was merged into Tukums Municipality.

See also 
 Administrative divisions of Latvia (2009)

Gallery

References 

 
Former municipalities of Latvia